Excelsior is a defunct restaurant located in Hotel de l'Europe, Amsterdam, Netherlands. It was a fine dining restaurant that was awarded one Michelin stars for the period 1957-1970 and for the period 1987–1992.

Restaurant Excelsior closed in 2010 and was replaced by "Restaurant Bord'Eau" in February 2011.

Head chefs
Amongst others:
 B. Koeleman 1938-1940
 Gerard Dresscher 1979-1989
 Imko Binnerts 1989-1994
 Jean Jacques Menanteau 1994-2009
 Richard van Oostenbrugge 2010

See also
List of Michelin starred restaurants in the Netherlands

References

External links
  History of the hotel and restaurant

Defunct restaurants in the Netherlands
Michelin Guide starred restaurants in the Netherlands
Restaurants in Amsterdam